Palm Sunday Massacre may refer to:
 Palm Sunday massacre (homicide), a 1984 multiple homicide in Brooklyn, New York
 Battle of Palm Sunday or Massacre of Palm Sunday, a 1429 Scottish clan battle
 Palm Sunday Massacre, a 1943 World War II battle as part of Operation Flax
 Palm Sunday church bombings, twin church bombings in Egypt on April 9, 2017.